Lakeem "Keem" Jackson (born August 10, 1990) is an American professional basketball player for Aomori Wat's of the Japanese B.League. At a weight of 235 lbs and a height of 196 cm (6'5), he plays the small forward position.

High school
Jackson attended Christ School (North Carolina), in Arden, North Carolina, where he also played high school basketball.

College career
Jackson played college basketball at the University of South Carolina (NCAA Division I), where he played with the South Carolina Gamecocks.

Professional career
On August 13, 2013, Jackson signed his first professional contract with Slovak Extraliga club BK Iskra Svit. During this season he won the Slovak cup finals and made a run for the league championship, but would soon fall in the semi-finals to club BC Prievidza.

On July 20, 2014, Jackson signed a contract extension with BK Iskra Svit.

On June 25, 2015, Jackson signed his third professional contract with his second club RheinStars Köln of the ProA which is the  second-tier level.

On October 15, 2016, Jackson signed his fourth professional contract with his third club ETB Wohnbau Baskets in the ProA of Germany. On December 31, 2016, he parted ways with ETB and signed his fifth professional contract with Korean Basketball League club Busan KT Sonicboom

Jackson played for Bambitious Nara of the  B.League.during the 2020–21 season, averaging 14.2 points, 6.9 rebounds, 3.1 assists and 1.1 steals per game. On December 10, 2021, he signed with Aomori Wat's.

Career statistics

Domestic leagues

References

External links 

 
  FIBA Game Center Profile 
  Eurobasket.com Profile 
 South Carolina Gamecocks bio

Living people
1990 births
American expatriate basketball people in Germany
American expatriate basketball people in Japan
American expatriate basketball people in Slovakia
American expatriate basketball people in South Korea
American men's basketball players
Aomori Wat's players
Bambitious Nara players
Basketball players from Charlotte, North Carolina
Suwon KT Sonicboom players
Ehime Orange Vikings players
Small forwards
South Carolina Gamecocks men's basketball players